Ardron is an English surname. Notable people with the surname include:

 Tyler Ardron (born 1991), Canadian rugby union player
 Wally Ardron (1918–1978), English footballer

See also
 Ardrossan (disambiguation)
 Arron

English-language surnames